John Dougall Manners (August 26, 1914 – April 11, 1986) was a Canadian football player who played for the Winnipeg Blue Bombers. He won the Grey Cup with them in 1939 and 1941.

References

1914 births
1986 deaths
Canadian football guards
Winnipeg Blue Bombers players
Players of Canadian football from Ontario
Canadian football people from Ottawa